The third government of Adolfo Suárez was formed on 6 April 1979, following the latter's election as Prime Minister of Spain by the Congress of Deputies on 30 March and his swearing-in on 2 April, as a result of the Union of the Democratic Centre (UCD) emerging as the largest parliamentary force at the 1979 Spanish general election.

Suárez's third cabinet was the first to be appointed under the Spanish Constitution of 1978, and was an all-UCD government plus two military officers (Manuel Gutiérrez Mellado and Antonio Ibáñez Freire); subsequent reshuffles in 1980 seeing would see the incorporation of a number of independents. It was automatically dismissed on 29 January 1981 as a consequence of Adolfo Suárez's resignation as Prime Minister, but remained in acting capacity until the next government was sworn in.

Investiture

Cabinet changes
Suárez's third government saw a number of cabinet changes during its tenure:

On 17 January 1980, Manuel Clavero resigned as Minister of Culture over political differences with the Union of the Democratic Centre (UCD) on the issue of the Andalusian autonomy and his party's stance on the 28 February 1980 autonomy initiative referendum. He was replaced in the post by Ricardo de la Cierva, who was sworn into office on the following day. Suárez took the opportunity of Clavero's resignation to make another cabinet change, by transferring some of the powers from Rafael Arias-Salgado's department to José Pedro Pérez-Llorca's Ministry of the Presidency.
On 3 May 1980, what had initially been planned as a minor cabinet readjustment intended to create a third deputy prime minister office for regional affairs under José Pedro Pérez-Llorca turned into a major reshuffle as a result of power struggles within the UCD: Antonio Ibáñez Freire (Interior), Carlos Bustelo (Industry and Energy) and Juan Antonio García Díez (Trade and Tourism) were replaced by Juan José Rosón, Ignacio Bayón and Luis Gámir, respectively. Pérez-Llorca's new appointment was limited to the Ministry of Territorial Administration, replacing Antonio Fontán, whereas Pérez-Llorca's former presidency department was reassigned to Rafael Arias-Salgado and its competences split into two additional deputy ministries headed by Sebastián Martín-Retortillo (Responsible for Public Administration) and Juan Antonio Ortega y Díaz-Ambrona (Responsible for Legislative Coordination). Salvador Sánchez-Terán was moved from Transport and Communications—which was assigned to José Luis Álvarez—to Labour (replacing Rafael Calvo Ortega) and the post of deputy minister held by Joaquín Garrigues Walker was abolished.
The last cabinet reshuffle under Adolfo Suárez took place on 9 September 1980, on the eve of a motion of confidence called by Suárez upon his own government scheduled for 18 September, aimed at strengthening his stand within the UCD by having the most prominent figures from the party's ideological factions represented in the government. Leopoldo Calvo-Sotelo replaced Fernando Abril Martorell as Second Deputy Prime Minister, Marcelino Oreja stepped down in favour of José Pedro Pérez-Llorca as Minister of Foreign Affairs and Íñigo Cavero was moved from Justice—assigned to Francisco Fernández Ordóñez—to Culture. Further changes were seen in Education (from José Manuel Otero to Juan Antonio Ortega y Díaz-Ambrona), Labour (Sánchez-Terán was replaced by Félix Manuel Pérez Miyares) and Calvo-Sotelo's vacant ministry, Relations with the European Communities (to Eduard Punset). The reshuffle also saw the recovery of some members from former cabinets, such as Alberto Oliart (in Health and Social Security), Juan Antonio García Díez (in Economy and Trade), Rodolfo Martín Villa (in Territorial Administration) and Pío Cabanillas Gallas (as deputy minister to the Prime Minister). Meanwhile, the deputy ministry for Legislative Coordination was abolished.

Council of Ministers
The Council of Ministers was structured into the offices for the prime minister, the two deputy prime ministers and 21 ministries, including a number of deputy ministers without portfolio. This number would be maintained in the May 1980 reshuffle with some changes within the deputy ministries, one of which would be abolished in the September 1980 reshuffle.

Departmental structure
Adolfo Suárez's third government was organised into several superior and governing units, whose number, powers and hierarchical structure varied depending on the ministerial department.

Unit/body rank
() Secretary of state
() Undersecretary
() Director-general
() Autonomous agency
() Military & intelligence agency

Notes

References

External links
Governments. Juan Carlos I (20.11.1975 ...). CCHS-CSIC (in Spanish).
Governments of Spain 1977–1982. Ministers of Adolfo Suárez and Leopoldo Calvo-Sotelo. Historia Electoral.com (in Spanish).
The governments of the Union of the Democratic Centre (1977–1982). Lluís Belenes i Rodríguez History Page (in Spanish).

1979 establishments in Spain
1981 disestablishments in Spain
Cabinets established in 1979
Cabinets disestablished in 1981
Council of Ministers (Spain)